Beckenham Beacon is a redeveloped health centre in Beckenham, on the site of the old Beckenham Hospital, in the London Borough of Bromley, England. It is managed by King's College Hospital NHS Foundation Trust. It opened in 2009.

History
The hospital was established on the site of the old Beckenham Hospital in 2009.

Services
The centre provides community health services, a minor injuries unit, Special Care Dental Services and out of hours emergency  dental service, x-ray facilities, a pharmacy and blood testing as well as general practitioner services at the Elm House Surgery and the Cator Medical Centre.

See also
 List of hospitals in England

References

Health in London